"Into the Unknown" is a song recorded by American actress and singer-songwriter Idina Menzel and Norwegian singer-songwriter Aurora from the 2019 Disney film Frozen II, with music and lyrics composed by Kristen Anderson-Lopez and Robert Lopez. The song received Academy Award, Critics' Choice Movie Award, Golden Globe Award and Satellite Award nominations for Best Original Song, but lost each award to "(I'm Gonna) Love Me Again" from Rocketman.

Production 
Anderson-Lopez and Lopez, who wrote the songs for the 2013 animated film Frozen, reprised their roles for the sequel Frozen II. They also helped develop the story alongside Chris Buck, Jennifer Lee, and Marc E. Smith. Once a foundation for the story emerged, Anderson-Lopez and Lopez marked out points where songs would be used to move the story forward. The pair needed a song for a major moment for Elsa. Initially, the pair wrote a song called "I Seek the Truth" for the moment. At this point, the concept of Elsa hearing and following a mysterious voice had not been conceived yet. When this plot point was developed, the pair went back to the scene and wrote "Into the Unknown".

Menzel first sang the song in her dressing room backstage at an off-Broadway play, with Anderson-Lopez and Lopez bringing in a keyboard to provide the music.

Context 

The song is Elsa's "flagship number", and prominently features a siren call that serves as the film's musical motif that Christophe Beck weaves throughout the film score. The call is derived from the Latin sequence Dies irae, but is delivered in a manner inspired by the Scandinavian music form kulning.

Within the narrative of the film, the song details Elsa's inner conflict over deciding whether or not to leave Arendelle and track down the source of a mysterious voice she keeps hearing.

International versions 
On its theater release, the movie numbered 48 dubbings worldwide, to which an Indonesian and Malay version was added the following year, with the song Into the Unknown counting 47 versions overall: Charlotte Hervieux's recording of the song was used in both French versions released in Europe and Canada, although the rest of the dubbings were independent. Among the dubbings released, a version in Tamil, Telugu and Northern Sami was recorded for the sequel, even though the first movie has never been dubbed into these languages. As it happened in Moana with a Tahitian, Māori and Hawaiian version, the Sami version was an exceptional dubbing made specifically for the movie, given the inspiration it took from Sami culture.

As was done for Frozen, Dutch musical actress Willemijn Verkaik sang both for the Dutch and German-language version, while Spanish singer Gisela performed both the Catalan and European Spanish version.

On December 13, a multi-language video of the song featuring 29 of the 47 existing versions was published on Disney's Vevo channel. On February 9, 2020, Menzel and Aurora performed the song during the 92nd Academy Awards together with nine of the song's international singers singing in nine different languages: Maria Lucia Heiberg Rosenberg in Danish, Willemijn Verkaik in German, Takako Matsu in Japanese, Gisela in European Spanish, Carmen Sarahí in Latin American Spanish, Lisa Stokke in Norwegian, Kasia Łaska in Polish, Anna Buturlina in Russian and Gam Wichayanee in Thai.

Reception

Critical reception
The song was presented to the public as the "Let It Go" of Frozen II. Slate argues that the song was "engineered to deliver the same euphoria of internal struggle followed by cathartic release." The Daily Telegraph suggested that it had the same catchy qualities as its predecessor but that time would tell if younger fans of the film would accept it as a hit.

Accolades

Personnel 
Credits adapted from Tidal.

 Earl Ghaffari – editing
 David Boucher – mixing, recording engineer
 Andrew Page – music production
 Tom Hardisty – recording
 Kevin Harp – recording engineer
 Dave Metzger – recording arranger
 Joey Raia – recording engineer
 Gabe Guy – assistant recording engineer
 Nathan Eaton – assistant recording engineer
 Zach Hancock – assistant recording engineer
 Paul McGrath – assistant recording engineer
 Jack Mills – assistant recording engineer
 Juan Pena – assistant recording engineer
 John Prestage – assistant recording engineer
 Adam Schoeller – assistant recording engineer
 Morgan Stratton – assistant recording engineer

Charts

Certifications

Panic! at the Disco version 

Most dubbings played the English version, performed by American rock band Panic! at the Disco, over the end credits. However the song numbers 12 more versions in other languages. The Japanese and Korean versions opted for two female vocalists, while the version used for the Mandarin version made for China was sung by an ensemble. The Hindi, Tamil and Telugu versions were all performed by Indian singer Nakul Abhyankar, who also dubbed Kristoff in Tamil and Telugu, and sang Weezer's version of "Lost in the Woods" into all three languages.

Personnel
Credits adapted from Tidal.

 Claudis Mittendorfer – mixing
 Rachel White – recording arranger
 Suzy Shinn  – recording engineer
 Steve Genewick – assistant recording engineer

Charts

Certifications

References

2019 singles
2019 songs
2010s ballads
American songs
Idina Menzel songs
Panic! at the Disco songs
Taeyeon songs
Songs from Frozen (franchise)
Songs with feminist themes
Songs written by Kristen Anderson-Lopez
Songs written by Robert Lopez
Walt Disney Records singles